Jimmy Dean Rudd (born  c. 1943), known as Jim Rudd, is an attorney and a Democratic former member of the Texas House of Representatives from Brownfield in Terry County in West Texas. He held the District 77 seat from 1977 to 1993. For his last term from 1993 to 1995, he represented District 80.

After he left the state House, Rudd became a lobbyist in the capital city of Austin, Texas. The Jim D. Rudd Transfer Facility, a unit of the Texas Department of Corrections, located on the Lamesa Highway in Brownfield is named in his honor.

References

1943 births
Living people
Democratic Party members of the Texas House of Representatives
People from Brownfield, Texas
People from Austin, Texas
Texas lawyers
American lobbyists